Diana Bacosi (born 13 July 1983) is an Italian shooter. She began shooting at 14. She represented her country in Women's skeet shooting at the 2016 Summer Olympics where she won the gold medal, and at the 2020 Summer Olympics where she won the silver medal.

Career
Bacosi began shooting at the age of 14, as it was a family tradition. At the age of 18, she narrowed her passion for shooting and focused on skeet shooting professionally. She made her debut in 2004 on the ISSF "world stage during the European Championships in Nicosia, where she finished in 16th position."

In the 2005 World Cup in Brazil, Bacosi finished second place. Bacosi was awarded a Bronze Medal for Supporting Merit in 2007. The following year she won Gold in the World Cup at Suhl and Silver at the World Cup in Beijing. In 2008, as well, she gained a Silver Medal for Supporting Merit and "was also awarded the "Discobolo d’Oro" (Golden Discus) by the Italian Sports Centre National Council."

In 2011, she received another Silver Medal in the Tucson desert and the "Stella d’Oro" (Silver Star) for Athletic Valour. In 2013 she was awarded the Silver Medal at the World Cup in Acapulco and two bronze medals respectively at Nicosia and the final in Abu Dhabi. In the same year, she won the World Championships in Lima.

Bacosi continued to place Bronze in the World Cup Finals in Abu Dhabi (2013), Gabala (2014), Nicosia (2015), Rome (2016), and then subsequently won Silver in New Delhi in 2017.
She won the World Cup in 2015 in Larnaka and Al Ain, respectively.

Bacosi's biggest achievement was when she won the Olympic Gold Medal in Women's Skeet Shooting in Rio de Janeiro in 2016. Talking about the win, Bacosi said: "winning an Olympic medal is a unique emotion, also because you get there after a long preparation" but when asked if it was more exciting than becoming a mother she replied: "no, that’s above all and everyone. But gold comes soon after."

In 2018, Bacosi began competing in Skeet Women (SK125W) competitions. From this, she achieved Gold in Changwon in 2018, and Lonato in 2019. She won Gold for the European games in 2019 and won several Silver medals in 2018 and 2019 in Changwon, Siggiewi, Acapulco and Al Ain.

In 2019, Bacosi began competing in the Skeet Mixed Team (SKMIX) and won Gold that year in Lonato and Silver in Minsk. She was selected to partake in the 2020 Tokyo Olympics before they were delayed by COVID-19.

Personal life
Bacosi gave birth to her first son, Mattia, who was born on the 13th of February, 2009. On the 11th of November 2011, Bacosi married a man named Vincent.

Awards and honors
Bronze Medal for Sporting Merit - 2007
Discobolo d’Oro (Golden Discus Thrower) - 2008
Stella d’Oro (Golden Star) for Athletic Valor - 2011

References

External links
 
 

1983 births
Living people
European Games medalists in shooting
European Games gold medalists for Italy
European Games silver medalists for Italy
Italian female sport shooters
Medalists at the 2016 Summer Olympics
Medalists at the 2020 Summer Olympics
Olympic gold medalists for Italy
Olympic silver medalists for Italy
Olympic medalists in shooting
Olympic shooters of Italy
Shooters at the 2016 Summer Olympics
Shooters at the 2020 Summer Olympics
Shooters at the 2015 European Games
Shooters at the 2019 European Games
Shooters of Gruppo Sportivo Esercito
Skeet shooters